Bure, also known as Bubbure, is an Afro-Asiatic language belonging to the Bole-Tangale group of the West branch of the Chadic family. It is spoken in northern Nigeria in the village of Bure (10°31’06.16”N, 10°20’03.00”E, Kirfi Local Government, Bauchi State, Nigeria) and in some small settlements nearby. The language is used mostly by a very few speakers, of great-grandparental generation. Except for Hausa, which is lingua franca in the area, Bure is surrounded by other Chadic languages such as Gera, Giiwo and Deno (Bole group).
Compared to other languages of the same group (e.g. Bole or Karekare), the endangerment of Bure is by far the most critical.

Notes

References
 Batic, Gian Claudio. 2014. A Grammatical Sketch of Bure. Köln: Rüdiger Köppe: 2014. .
 Batic, G. I. A. N. 2013. Documenting Bure, a Chadic Language of Northern Nigeria: the Clause Structure. In 14th Italian Meeting of Afro-Asiatic Linguistics (Dell'Orso), pp. 225–238.
 Batic, Gian Claudio. 2011. Documenting Bure, a Chadic Language of Northern Nigeria: the Clause Structure. Paper presented at the '14th Italian Meeting of Afro-Asiatic Linguistics' (University of Turin, 15–18 June 2011).
 Batic, Gian Claudio. 2011. The Bure Language: an Overview. Paper presented at the '6th Biennial International Colloquium on the Chadic Languages' (CNRS LLACAN, Villejuif 22–23 September 2011).
 Haruna, Andrew. 2000. Language Death: The case of Bubburè in Southern Bauchi Area, Northern Nigeria. In Matthias Brenzinger (ed.), 'Endangered languages in Africa': 27-51. Köln: Rüdiger Köppe.

External links 
OLAC resources in and about the Bure language

West Chadic languages
Languages of Nigeria